Tribute to Uncle Ray is the second studio album by Stevie Wonder. Released by Motown in October, 1962, shortly after The Jazz Soul of Little Stevie. It had been recorded first, when Wonder was just 11 years old.  The album was an attempt by Berry Gordy and Motown to associate the young "Little Stevie Wonder" with the successful and popular Ray Charles who was also a blind African American musician. Like his debut, this album failed to generate hit singles as Motown struggled to find a sound to fit Wonder, who was just 12 when this album was released.

Track listing
All songs composed by Ray Charles, except where indicated.

Side one
"Hallelujah I Love Her So" – 2:28
"Ain't That Love" – 2:42
"Don't You Know" – 3:03
"(I'm Afraid) The Masquerade Is Over" (Herbert Magidson, Allie Wrubel) – 4:19
"Frankie & Johnny" (Traditional; arranged by Clarence Paul) – 2:51

Side two
"Drown in My Own Tears" (Henry Glover) – 4:01
"Come Back Baby" - 2:50
"Mary Ann" – 2:59
"Sunset" (Stevie Wonder as Stevie Judkins, Clarence Paul) – 3:32
"My Baby's Gone" (Berry Gordy, Jr.) – 2:28

References

Stevie Wonder albums
1962 albums
Tamla Records albums
Albums produced by Henry Cosby
Albums produced by Clarence Paul
Albums recorded at Hitsville U.S.A.
Ray Charles tribute albums